Cape Broms is a cape which marks the south side of the entrance to Rohss Bay on the west side of James Ross Island, off the northeast end of Antarctic Peninsula. It was discovered by the Swedish Antarctic Expedition, 1901–04, under Otto Nordenskiöld, who named it for G.E. Broms, a patron of the expedition.

References
 

Headlands of James Ross Island